Life Sahi Hai is an Indian coming of age comedy series created by Tarun Jain. It is produced by Luv Ranjan and Ankur Garg under their company named Luv Films. Several staff members on the series had previously collaborated on the Pyaar Ka Punchnama franchise.

The first season of the show was released on YouTube in June 2016. The second season was released on ZEE5 in April 2018.

Plot summary 
Life Sahi Hai is a sitcom revolving around four men, who have moved to Delhi with the intention to live independently for the first time, and the trouble they encounter in pursuing this goal. Throughout the series, the main characters retain positive attitudes toward their situation, as exemplified by the statement 'Life Sahi Hai'.

Cast 
Siddhant Chaturvedi as Sahil Hooda
Abhishek Saha as Siddharth Srivastava
 Suhail Nayyar as Jasjit Singh
 Tarun Jain as Amit Jain
 Brijendra Kala as  Sinha
 Gunjan Malhotra as Shruti Aggarwal
 Mona Ambegaonkar as Jasjit's mother
 Meenakshi Sethi as Amit's mother
 Karishma Sharma as The Maid
 Rajesh Sharma as Maid agency owner
 Saloni Batra as Neha
 Poorti Arya as The Maid
 Rumana Molla as Divya

Episodes

Season 1

Season 2

Reception 
India Forums  gave a review of the webseries declaring that the concept of the series is brilliant. The storyline revolves around the lives of four bachelors. All the actors performed their roles very well. Visuals of the songs in the series are quite appealing. The show displays practical life experiences and typical life of bachelors. The unique concept and story will leave the viewers wanting for more.

Blogtobollywood reviewed the season 2 of Life Sahi Hai. They stated that the series is youth centric and is very different concept from what the usual daily soaps has to offer. Season 1 was hilaorious and performance of the actors were spot on. In Season 2 the plotline didn't fail to impress as many scenes displayed a sense of relevance to the millennial viewers. The comic timing of the lead actors is outstanding and the supporting characters did a great job as well. Overall, the series has a relevant content and is quite entertaining.

References

External links 
Life Sahi Hai on ZEE5
 

2016 web series debuts
Indian comedy web series
YouTube original programming
Hindi-language web series
ZEE5 original programming